The 2010–11 season was Real Madrid's 28th season in Liga ACB. The club played all home games this season at the Caja Mágica, moving from Palacio Vistalegre, their previous home for six seasons.

This article shows player statistics and all matches (official and friendly) that the club played during the 2010–11 season.

Players

Depth chart

Transfers

In

Out

Statistics

ACB season

Euroleague

Awards
ACB Weekly MVP

ACB Player of the Month

ACB Coach of the Month

Euroleague Weekly MVP

Euroleague Rising Star
{|class="wikitable sortable" style="text-align: center;"
! align="center"|Year
! align="center"|Player
! align="center"|Source
|-
|2010–11|| Nikola Mirotić||

Competitions

Overall

Liga ACB

Standings

Last updated: 15 May 2011
Source: Realmadrid.com

Results summary

Last updated: 15 May 2011
Source: Realmadrid.com

Results by round

Euroleague

Regular Season Group B

Last updated: 23 December 2010
Source: Euroleague.net

Top 16 Group G

Last updated: 4 March 2011
Source: Euroleague.net

Quarterfinals

Last updated: 7 April 2011Source: Euroleague.net

Final Four

Last updated: 8 May 2011Source: Euroleague.net

Copa del Rey

Last updated: 13 February 2010Source: Copadelreyacb.com

Matches

Liga ACB

|- style="background-color:#bbffbb;"
| 1
| 30 September
| @ Asefa Estudiantes
| W 84–79 
| Carlos Suárez (21)
| D'or Fischer (8)
| Sergio Llull (4)
| Palacio de Deportes de la Comunidad de Madrid 13,000
| 1–0

|- style="background-color:#bbffbb;"
| 2
| 10 October
| Assignia Manresa
| W 81–63 
| Clay Tucker (16)
| D'or Fischer (13)
| Carlos Suárez (4)
| Caja Mágica 7,143
| 2–0
|- style="background-color:#bbffbb;"
| 3
| 16 October
| @ Bizkaia Bilbao Basket
| W 75–73 
| Ante Tomić (14)
| Ante Tomić (9)
| Sergio Rodríguez (4)
| Bizkaia Arena 8,534
| 3–0
|- style="background-color:#bbffbb;"
| 4
| 23 October
| Power Electronics Valencia
| W 75–63 
| Clay Tucker (18)
| Felipe Reyes (13)
| Felipe Reyes (6)
| Caja Mágica 6,154
| 4–0
|- style="background-color:#ffcccc;"
| 5
| 30 October
| @ Meridiano Alicante
| L 67–78 
| Carlos Suárez (16)
| Carlos Suárez (9)
| Sergio Rodríguez, Carlos Suárez (2)
| Centro de Tecnificación 4,270
| 4–1

|- style="background-color:#bbffbb;"
| 6
| 7 November
| Lagun Aro GBC
| W 83–53 
| Sergio Llull, Sergio Rodríguez (14)
| Novica Veličković (9)
| Novica Veličković (4)
| Telefónica Arena Madrid 6,452
| 5–1
|- style="background-color:#bbffbb;"
| 7
| 13 November
| @ DKV Joventut
| W 72–64 
| Sergio Llull (17)
| D'or Fischer (11)
| Sergio Rodríguez (4)
| Palau Olímpic 8,968
| 6–1
|- style="background-color:#bbffbb;"
| 8
| 21 November
| Blancos de Rueda Valladolid
| W 87–82 
| Carlos Suárez, Ante Tomić (16)
| Carlos Suárez, Ante Tomić (7)
| Sergio Llull, Clay Tucker (5)
| Caja Mágica 6,352
| 7–1
|- style="background-color:#ffcccc;"
| 9
| 28 November
| @ Gran Canaria 2014
| L 70–59 
| Felipe Reyes, Clay Tucker (13)
| D'or Fischer (8)
| Sergio Llull (4)
| Centro Insular 4,963
| 7–2

|- style="background-color:#bbffbb;"
| 10
| 4 December
| Unicaja
| W 88–72 
| Felipe Reyes (18)
| Felipe Reyes (11)
| Sergio Llull, Sergio Rodríguez (6)
| Caja Mágica 6,690
| 8–2
|- style="background-color:#bbffbb;"
| 11
| 12 December
| CAI Zaragoza
| W 84–65 
| Clay Tucker (16)
| Ante Tomić (5)
| Pablo Prigioni (9)
| Caja Mágica 5,638
| 9–2
|- style="background-color:#bbffbb;"
| 12
| 18 December
| @ Caja Laboral
| W 72–67 
| Felipe Reyes (21)
| Carlos Suárez (7)
| Pablo Prigioni (4)
| Fernando Buesa Arena 9,700
| 10–2
|- style="background-color:#ffcccc;"
| 13
| 30 December
| @ Regal FC Barcelona
| L 75–95 
| Sergio Rodríguez, Clay Tucker (13)
| D'or Fischer (10)
| Sergio Rodríguez (4)
| Palau Blaugrana 7,411
| 10–3

|- style="background-color:#bbffbb;"
| 14
| 2 January
| CB Granada
| W 84–57 
| Nikola Mirotić (17)
| D'or Fischer, Ante Tomić (6)
| Pablo Prigioni (5)
| Caja Mágica 4,415
| 11–3
|- style="background-color:#bbffbb;"
| 15
| 9 January
| ViveMenorca
| W 95–84 
| Sergio Llull, Carlos Suárez (18)
| Novica Veličković (4)
| Sergio Llull (6)
| Caja Mágica 4,980
| 12–3
|- style="background-color:#bbffbb;"
| 16
| 13 January
| @ Cajasol
| W 89–75 
| Clay Tucker (26)
| Nikola Mirotić (6)
| Pablo Prigioni (5)
| Palacio Municipal San Pablo 6,800
| 13–3
|- style="background-color:#bbffbb;"
| 17
| 16 January
| Baloncesto Fuenlabrada
| W 76–75 
| Nikola Mirotić (19)
| Nikola Mirotić (7)
| Sergio Rodríguez (6)
| Caja Mágica 5,579
| 14–3
|- style="background-color:#bbffbb;"
| 18
| 22 January
| Asefa Estudiantes
| W 82–61 
| Sergio Llull (17)
| Carlos Suárez (8)
| Pablo Prigioni (6)
| Caja Mágica 8,034
| 15–3
|- style="background-color:#bbffbb;"
| 19
| 30 January
| @ Assignia Manresa
| W 62–61 
| Nikola Mirotić, Clay Tucker (10)
| Felipe Reyes (9)
| Pablo Prigioni (4)
| Pavelló Nou Congost 4,300
| 16–3

|- style="background-color:#bbffbb;"
| 20
| 5 February
| Bizkaia Bilbao Basket
| W 76–72 
| Pablo Prigioni (14)
| Carlos Suárez (7)
| Sergio Llull (7)
| Caja Mágica 6,123
| 17–3
|- style="background-color:#ffcccc;"
| 21
| 19 February
| @ Power Electronics Valencia
| L 52–59 
| Carlos Suárez (18)
| Nikola Mirotić (7)
| Pablo Prigioni (4)
| Pabellón Fuente San Luis 8,900
| 17–4
|- style="background-color:#ffcccc;"
| 22
| 26 February
| @ Blancos de Rueda Valladolid
| L 65–74 
| Sergio Rodríguez (13)
| Novica Veličković (7)
| Sergio Llull (5)
| Polideportivo Pisuerga 6,020
| 17–5

|- style="background-color:#bbffbb;"
| 23
| 5 March
| DKV Joventut
| W 78–60 
| Sergio Llull, Ante Tomić (13)
| Felipe Reyes (9)
| Sergio Llull (6)
| Caja Mágica 5,886
| 18–5
|- style="background-color:#bbffbb;"
| 24
| 10 March
| @ Lagun Aro GBC
| W 88–78 (OT) 
| Sergio Llull (21)
| Nikola Mirotić, Felipe Reyes, Carlos Suárez (6)
| Pablo Prigioni (10)
| San Sebastián Arena 2016 6,790
| 19–5
|- style="background-color:#bbffbb;"
| 25
| 13 March
| Meridiano Alicante
| W 80–62 
| Mirza Begić, Nikola Mirotić, Ante Tomić (12)
| Nikola Mirotić, Carlos Suárez (7)
| Sergio Llull, Pablo Prigioni, Sergio Rodríguez (4)
| Caja Mágica 4,996
| 20–5
|- style="background-color:#ffcccc;"
| 26
| 19 March
| @ Unicaja
| L 68–69 (OT) 
| Pablo Prigioni (21)
| Nikola Mirotić (9)
| Pablo Prigioni (4)
| Jose Maria Martin Carpena Arena 11,000
| 20–6
|- style="background-color:#bbffbb;"
| 27
| 26 March
| Gran Canaria 2014
| W 74–73 
| Sergio Llull (19)
| Felipe Reyes (7)
| Pablo Prigioni (6)
| Caja Mágica 6,139
| 21–6

|- style="background-color:#bbffbb;"
| 28
| 3 April
| @ CB Granada
| W 73–65 
| Pablo Prigioni (15)
| Nikola Mirotić (7)
| Pablo Prigioni (8)
| Palacio de los Deportes de Granada 7,095
| 22–6
|- style="background-color:#bbffbb;"
| 29
| 9 April
| Regal FC Barcelona
| W 77–72 (OT) 
| Carlos Suárez (19)
| Carlos Suárez (7)
| Pablo Prigioni (6)
| Caja Mágica 10,788
| 23–6
|- style="background-color:#ffcccc;"
| 30
| 16 April
| @ CAI Zaragoza
| L 84–86 
| Felipe Reyes, Carlos Suárez (14)
| Ante Tomić (7)
| Sergio Rodríguez, Clay Tucker (6)
| Pabellón Príncipe Felipe 9,200
| 23–7
|- style="background-color:#bbffbb;"
| 31
| 23 April
| Caja Laboral
| W 76–71 
| D'or Fischer (19)
| Felipe Reyes (8)
| Carlos Suárez (5)
| Caja Mágica 6,253
| 24–7

|- style="background-color:#ffcccc;"
| 32
| 1 May
| @ Baloncesto Fuenlabrada
| L 79–88 
| Sergio Llull (17)
| D'or Fischer (6)
| Sergio Llull (5)
| Pabellón Fernando Martín 5,497
| 24–8
|- style="background-color:#bbffbb;"
| 33
| 12 May
| Cajasol
| W 78–59 
| Sergio Rodríguez (19)
| Felipe Reyes (7)
| Sergio Llull (7)
| Caja Mágica 4,784
| 25–8
|- style="background-color:#bbffbb;"
| 34
| 15 May
| @ ViveMenorca
| W 91–76 
| D'or Fischer (24)
| D'or Fischer (8)
| Clay Tucker (4)
| Pabellón Menorca 4,400
| 26–8

Euroleague

Regular season

Source: Euroleague.net

Top 16

Source: Euroleague.net

Quarterfinals
Game 1

Game 2

Game 3

Game 4

Game 5

Source: Euroleague.net

Final Four

Semifinals

Third-place playoff

Source: Euroleague.net

Copa del Rey

Quarterfinals

Semifinals

Final

Source: Copadelreyacb.com

Spanish Supercup

Semifinals

Preseason and exhibitions

Villa de Mislata Trophy

Community of Madrid tournament

See also
2010–11 ACB season
2010–11 Euroleague
Supercopa de España de Baloncesto 2010

Notes and references

External links
 Official website
 Real Madrid at ACB.com 
 Real Madrid at Euroleague.net

 
Real Madrid Baloncesto
Real Madrid